This is the list of UNDP (United Nations Development Programme) country codes.

In addition to countries, codes identify geographical groupings and political entities such as various liberation fronts (not all of which still exist). The purpose of the codes is in part actuarial.

External links
 UNDP Reference Table Gateway

United Nations Development Programme
Lists of country codes